Dylan Akpess Esmel (born 20 March 1998) is an Ivorian professional footballer who plays as a midfielder for TuS Koblenz.

Career
Esmel made three appearances in the 2. Bundesliga for 1. FC Kaiserslautern. He joined TuS Koblenz of the fifth-tier Oberliga Rheinland-Pfalz/Saar in 2022.

References

1998 births
Living people
People from Dabou
Ivorian footballers
Association football midfielders
2. Bundesliga players
Regionalliga players
1. FC Kaiserslautern II players
1. FC Kaiserslautern players
FC Rot-Weiß Koblenz players
SV Eintracht Trier 05 players
Ivorian expatriate footballers
Ivorian expatriate sportspeople in Germany
Expatriate footballers in Germany